The Tributaries of the Clarion River drain parts of Jefferson, Clarion, and Armstrong counties, Pennsylvania. The following table lists all the named tributaries of the Clarion River, a tributary of the Allegheny River. For each stream, the name, tributary number, coordinate and political subdivision of the confluence, and coordinate of the source are given.

Direct tributaries

See also
List of tributaries of the Allegheny River
Tributaries of the Allegheny River

References

Rivers of Pennsylvania
Tributaries of the Allegheny River
Wild and Scenic Rivers of the United States
Allegheny Plateau
Rivers of Clarion County, Pennsylvania
Rivers of Elk County, Pennsylvania
Rivers of Forest County, Pennsylvania
Rivers of Jefferson County, Pennsylvania
Rivers of McKean County, Pennsylvania
Rivers of Venango County, Pennsylvania